Events in the year 1961 in China. The country had an estimated population of 695 million people.

Incumbents
 Chairman of the Chinese Communist Party – Mao Zedong
 President of the People's Republic of China – Liu Shaoqi
 Premier of the People's Republic of China – Zhou Enlai
 Chairman of the National People's Congress – Zhu De
 Vice President of the People's Republic of China – Soong Ching-ling and Dong Biwu
 Vice Premier of the People's Republic of China – Chen Yun

Governors  
 Governor of Anhui Province – Huang Yan
 Governor of Fujian Province – Wu Hongxiang
 Governor of Gansu Province – Deng Baoshan
 Governor of Guangdong Province – Chen Yu 
 Governor of Guizhou Province – Zhou Lin
 Governor of Hebei Province – Liu Zihou 
 Governor of Heilongjiang Province – Li Fanwu
 Governor of Henan Province – Wu Zhipu 
 Governor of Hubei Province – Zhang Tixue 
 Governor of Hunan Province – Cheng Qian 
 Governor of Jiangsu Province – Hui Yuyu 
 Governor of Jiangxi Province – Shao Shiping 
 Governor of Jilin Province – Li Youwen 
 Governor of Liaoning Province – Huang Oudong 
 Governor of Qinghai Province – Yuan Renyuan
 Governor of Shaanxi Province – Zhao Boping 
 Governor of Shandong Province – Tan Qilong 
 Governor of Shanxi Province – Wei Heng 
 Governor of Sichuan Province – Li Dazhang
 Governor of Yunnan Province – Ding Yichuan
 Governor of Zhejiang Province – Zhou Jianren

Events
 until February 9 - Campaign at the China–Burma border
 July 11 - Signing of the Sino-North Korean Mutual Aid and Cooperation Friendship Treaty
 Continuing Great Chinese Famine

Other events
 Establishment of the Logistical Engineering University of PLA, in Chongqing
 April 27 – A container shipping and logistics brand on worldwide, COSCO was founded. 
　Establishment of Oil Worker's Children Middle School, in Ranghulu District, Daqing, Heilongjiang

Sports
 April 5 to April 14 - 1961 World Table Tennis Championships

See also
1961 in Chinese film

References

 
1960s in China
Years of the 20th century in China